The Cardiff Fire are an ice hockey team based in Cardiff, Wales. They currently play in the NIHL South Division 2. The Cardiff Fire are a minor league affiliate of the Cardiff Devils of the Elite Ice Hockey League.

Season-by-season record

Club roster 2022–23

2021/22 Outgoing

References

Ice hockey teams in Wales
Sport in Cardiff
Ice hockey clubs established in 2015
2015 establishments in Wales